Wilman is a surname and occasional given name. A variant is Wilmans; further variants are Wilmann and Wilmanns, not covered here. Notable people named Wilman and Wilmans include:

Wilman 
 Andy Wilman (born 1962), English television producer
 David Wilman (born 1934), British hockey player
 Maria Wilman (1867–1957), South African geologist and botanist
 Wilman Conde (born 1982), Colombian footballer
 Wilman Modesta (born 1995), Dominican footballer

Wilmans 
 Edith Wilmans (1882–1966), Texas lawyer and politician

Other
 Wilmans Peaks, mountain summit in Washington state, named after John McDonald Wilmans

See also
 Wiilman (indigenous people)
 Willman (surname)